John Michael Vazquez (born May 11, 1970) is a United States district judge of the United States District Court for the District of New Jersey.

Early life and education
Vazquez was born in Honolulu, Hawaii, in 1970. His family moved to New Jersey when he was several months old. Vazquez received a Bachelor of Arts degree in 1992 from Rutgers University. He received a Juris Doctor, summa cum laude, in 1996 from Seton Hall University School of Law.

Legal career
Vasquez served as law clerk to Judge Herman D. Michels of the New Jersey Superior Court, Appellate Division, from 1996 to 1997.

He served as an associate in the Law Offices of Michael Critchley and Associates from 1997 to 2001. From 2001 to 2006, he was an Assistant United States Attorney in the U.S. Attorney's Office for the District of New Jersey. From 2006 to 2008, he worked in the Office of the New Jersey Attorney General, serving first as Special Assistant to the Attorney General and subsequently as First Assistant Attorney General. from 2008 to 2016, he was a partner at Critchley, Kinum & Vazquez, LLC. In that role, Vasquez represented Anthony R. Suarez, mayor of Ridgefield, New Jersey, during his 2010 trial on corruption charges, and won an acquittal, ending "a government streak of more than 200 public corruption convictions spanning more than a decade."

Federal judicial service

On March 26, 2015, President Barack Obama nominated Vazquez to serve as a United States District Judge of the United States District Court for the District of New Jersey, to the seat vacated by Judge Joel A. Pisano, who retired on February 16, 2015. Vasquez was unanimously rated as "well qualified" for the judgeship by the American Bar Association's Standing Committee on the Federal Judiciary, the committee's highest rating. His nomination received the support of both of New Jersey's senators, Cory Booker and Robert Menendez. His nomination was reported from the Senate Judiciary Committee on September 17, 2015, by a voice vote. 
Vazquez was confirmed by the Senate on January 27, 2016, by a 84–2 vote. He received his judicial commission on January 29, 2016.

See also
List of Hispanic/Latino American jurists

References

External links

1970 births
Living people
Assistant United States Attorneys
Judges of the United States District Court for the District of New Jersey
New Jersey lawyers
People from Honolulu
Rutgers University alumni
Seton Hall University School of Law alumni
United States district court judges appointed by Barack Obama
21st-century American judges
Hispanic and Latino American judges